Salim Kouider-Aïssa (born 22 March 1996) is a Scottish professional footballer who plays for Airdrieonians as a forward.

Career
Born in Glasgow, Kouider-Aïssa played youth football with Heart of Midlothian and Motherwell, and spent his early senior career with Stenhousemuir, Queen of the South and Stirling Albion. After a spell in Junior football with Lenzie Thistle and Kilsyth Rangers and time back in the League with Queen's Park, he signed for Livingston in July 2020 following a successful trial with the club. On 16 September 2020 he signed on loan for Partick Thistle for the 2020–21 season. However, after making just one league appearance for Thistle, Kouider-Aïssa was recalled by his parent club on 15 January 2021. On 9 March 2021, Kouider-Aïssa returned to former club Queens Park, on loan until the end of the season. 

Kouider-Aïssa moved to Airdrieonians on 8 July 2021, but he suffered a knee ligament injury that prevented him from playing for most of the 2021–22 season. He was loaned to Stranraer in September 2022, and would remain there until January 2023.

Personal life
Kouider-Aïssa's father is Algerian and his mother is Scottish. He is the nephew of fellow footballer Kevin McGoldrick, who was also his manager at Kilsyth Rangers.

Career statistics

References

1996 births
Living people
Scottish people of Algerian descent
Scottish footballers
Heart of Midlothian F.C. players
Motherwell F.C. players
Stenhousemuir F.C. players
Queen of the South F.C. players
Stirling Albion F.C. players
Kilsyth Rangers F.C. players
Queen's Park F.C. players
Livingston F.C. players
Partick Thistle F.C. players
Airdrieonians F.C. players
Scottish Football League players
Scottish Professional Football League players
Association football forwards
Sportspeople of Algerian descent
Stranraer F.C. players